Murosternum is a genus of longhorn beetles of the subfamily Lamiinae, containing the following species:

 Murosternum latefasciatum Breuning, 1938
 Murosternum mocquerysi Jordan, 1894
 Murosternum molitor Jordan, 1894
 Murosternum paramolitor Breuning, 1968
 Murosternum pentagonale Jordan, 1894
 Murosternum pulchellum (Dalman, 1817)

References

Tragocephalini
Cerambycidae genera